Tour Fantasía Pop is a live album recorded by Mexican synthpop band Belanova. It features live recordings of their tour supporting their third studio album, Fantasía Pop, and was released in 2008.

Track listing
All tracks by Belanova

Tour Fantasía Pop CD
"Intro"
"Rosa Pastel (Live)"
"Cada Que... (Live)"
"Por Esta Vez (Live)"
"Niño (Live)"
"Barco De Papel (Live)"
"Toma Mi Mano (Live)"
"Tus Ojos (Live)"
"Paso El Tiempo (Live)"
"Eres Tu (Live)"
"Me Pregunto (Live)"
"Por Ti (Live)"
"Baila Mi Corazon (Live)"
"Rockstar (Live)"
"One, Two, Three, Go! (Live)"

Tour Fantasía Pop DVD

"Intro"
"Rosa Pastel (Live)"
"Cada Que... (Live)"
"Por Esta Vez (Live)"
"Niño (Live)"
"Barco De Papel (Live)"
"Toma Mi Mano (Live)"
"Tus Ojos (Live)"
"Paso El Tiempo (Live)"
"Eres Tu (Live)"
"Me Pregunto (Live)"
"Por Ti (Live)"
"Baila Mi Corazon (Live)"
Entrevista 4 (Interview with the band)
"Rockstar (Live)"
"One, Two, Three, Go! (Live)"
Credits
"Solo De Bajo De Richie" (Richie's Bass Solo)

Personnel

Ricardo Arreola – guitar, Bass
Denisse Guerrero – vocals
Edgar Huerta – keyboards, programming

Belanova albums
2008 live albums
2008 video albums
Live video albums